Tammy Gambill is an American figure skating coach and former national-level skater. Several of her students have medaled at international competitions and three have competed at the Olympics. She has also won the 2005 USOC Developmental Coach Award.

Early years 
Gambill grew up in Sacramento, California. She first went ice skating with her Blue Bird troop. Her older sister was a competitive swimmer, but since Gambill didn't have the talent, she convinced her parents to let her take figure skating lessons. When she was 13, she moved to Los Angeles, to work with a top coach. She lived with a host family and qualified to the U.S. Championships.

Coaching career 
Gambill began coaching at age 19 in northern California before moving to Redlands, California in the 1990s. She began coaching in Icetown in Riverside, California when it opened in 1997. In May 2018, she agreed to coach at the World Arena Ice Hall in Colorado Springs, Colorado, beginning on June 25.

Her current students include:
 Karen Chen (2017 U.S. national champion, 2018 Olympian)
 Yi Christy Leung (2019 Chinese national champion)
 Camden Pulkinen
 Audrey Shin (2020 Skate America bronze medalist)
 Vincent Zhou (2017 World Junior champion, three-time U.S. national silver medalist (2017, 2019, 2021), 2018 Olympian)
 Young You (2020 Four Continents silver medalist, 4-time South Korean National champion (2015, 2018–20), 2019 Skate Canada bronze medalist, 2020 Youth Olympic champion)

Her former students include:
 Lindsay Davis
 Amanda Dobbs
 Richard Dornbush (2014 Lombardia Trophy champion, 2010–11 JGP Final champion, 2011 U.S. national silver medalist)
 Austin Kanallakan
 Ellie Kawamura
 Leah Keiser
 Brendan Kerry (2014 Olympian)
 Vanessa Lam
 Amy Lin
 Hannah Miller
 Daisuke Murakami
 Shotaro Omori
 Yaroslav Paniot
 Dennis Phan (2004 JGP Final champion and the 2003 U.S. national junior champion)
 Tyler Pierce (2014 U.S. national junior silver medalist)
 Sandra Rucker
 Ilana Sherman 
 Caroline Zhang (2012 Four Continents bronze medalist, 2009 U.S. national bronze medalist, 2007 world junior champion) 

She has received several awards including:
 2005 USOC Developmental Coach Award
 2005, 2012, 2013 U.S. Figure Skating / PSA Developmental Coach of the Year
 nominated for 2011 U.S. Figure Skating / PSA Coach of the Year

Gambill has also served on several U.S. Figure Skating committees, including Athlete Development Committee, Sports Sciences and Medicine Committee, and Coaches Committee. In 2006, she was chair of the Coaches Committee. She has been on the board of directors for both U.S. Figure Skating and Professional Skaters Association.

References 

Living people
American figure skating coaches
Sportspeople from Sacramento, California
Female sports coaches
American Olympic coaches
1957 births